Thung Liang Lee or Tang Liangli (pinyin: Tāng Liánglǐ) (1901–1970) was a journalist and politician in the Republic of China. He was an important politician during the Wang Jingwei regime (Republic of China-Nanjing). He was an overseas Chinese who was born in Java, Indonesia, and whose family place of origin was Fujian. His Indonesian name was Tubagus Pranata Tirtawidjaya.

Biography

Journalist 
T'ang Leang-Li spoke English better than Chinese. He studied at London University and Vienna University. In 1925 he acquired a B.Sc (Economics), from London University, and was recommended as a member of the Royal Economic Society.

In 1929, T'ang was appointed chief of the Communications Office to Europe, Central Executive Committee, Kuomintang. The next year, he returned to China and became Wang Jingwei's private secretary and a reporter for several foreign presses, including The New York Times, The Daily News (London), The Batavia Newspaper, and the news agency of the Social Democratic Party of Germany. He was also appointed president of Lianhua Shubao and general editor of The People's Tribune: A Journal of Fact and Opinion about China and Other Countries (China United Press, 1931-1942).

In 1931, Zhou Enlai who managed the central leading authority of the Communist Party of China in Shanghai, was pressured heavily by the Kuomintang. At that time, T'ang hid Zhou from the Kuomintang authorities, and with the assistance of a Western friend, enabled Zhou's escape from Shanghai.

In 1933, T'ang was appointed as an adviser to the Foreign Ministry, National Government, with minister extraordinary and plenipotentiary status. After that he became a general editor of the "China Today" Series and the English Encyclopedia of Modern China. During that time, he wrote extensively in English, with many of his works becoming influential both inside and outside China. Among these are, The New Currency System in China (1937), which was referred to by Milton Friedman.

In the Wang Jingwei regime 
In March 1940, when the Wang Jingwei regime was established, T'ang assumed formal office in the regime. In August of the same year, he was appointed director of the International Publicity Bureau, remaining at this post until the collapse of the regime following Japan's surrender in 1945. From May to August 1941 he also held the post of Policy Affairs Vice-Minister for the Foreign Affairs Ministry.

After the Wang Jingwei regime had collapsed, T'ang was arrested by Chiang Kai-shek's National Government; however, for unknown reasons, he was soon released. In 1949, he returned to Indonesia and lived in Jakarta. He participated in editing The Indonesian Review of International Affairs, and was interviewed by Japanese political scientist Tatsuo Yamada (who specialized in Chinese politics) on December 17, 1969.

T'ang Leang-Li died in 1970.

Works 
China in Revolt (London, 1927. German ed. 1930)
The Foundation of Modern China (London, 1928. Malay ed. Batavia, 1930)
The Inner History of the Chinese Revolution (London & New York, 1930)
Wang Ching-wei: A Political Biography (Tientsin, 1931)
Suppressing Communist Banditry in China (China United Press (Shanghai), 1934, "China Today" series, 1)
Reconstruction in China : A Record of Progress and Achievement in Facts and Figures (China United Press (Shanghai)(Shanghai), 1934, "China Today" series, 3)
The Puppet State of Manchukuo (China United Press (Shanghai), 1935, "China Today" series, 4)
The New Social Order in China (China United Press (Shanghai), 1936, "China Today" series, 6)
China Facts and Fancies  (China United Press (Shanghai), 1936, "China Today" series, 7)
China's New Currency System (China United Press (Shanghai), 1936, "China Today" series, 8)
The New Currency System in China, 1937)
Tomizou Nakayama (translator), The Organizations and Prospects of Chinese Society, A Guidepost for New China, Ikuseisya (育生社), 1940.
《》, 國民外交討論會, 1941
American Imperialism in China (1943 (Chinese Version, 1944年)
, published year was unknown.
Tatsuo Yamada (translator), Wang Jingwei - A Peaceful Warrior in Eastern Asia , Vol.45, No.10, October, 1972.

Alma mater 

University of LondonUniversity of Vienna

References

Footnotes 
 Liang Jie, "Friedman and the Issue of the Chinese Currency", November 20, 2006  People's Daily Online 
 Tatsuo Yamada (山田辰雄), "Interview from T'ang Leang-Li", 『』Keio University, Vol.45, No.10, October, 1972
 Lawrence Kessler,"Reconstructing Zhou Enlai's Escape from Shanghai in 1931: A Research Note," Twentieth-Century China, Volume 34, Number 2, 2008.
 Zhai Yaliu, "A Foreigner who let Zhou Enlai escape from Shanghai in 1931,"」 Bainianshu(), Number 9, 2010.
 
 
 
  History of Prison in Shanghai The Office of Shanghai’s　History (上海地方志办公室) Website

Members of the Kuomintang
Politicians of the Republic of China
Republic of China journalists
Chinese collaborators with Imperial Japan
Kuomintang collaborators with Imperial Japan
1901 births
1970 deaths
Alumni of the University of London
People from Java
Indonesian people of Chinese descent
Indonesian Hokkien people
Indonesian emigrants to China